Folimage is a French animation studio, based in Bourg-lès-Valence, Drôme, France. It was founded in 1981 by Jacques-Rémy Girerd. The studio produces animation films for cinema and TV (short films, TV specials and series, feature films). In 1999, the company founded an animation school, La Poudrière, also in Valence. In 2009, Folimage and La Poudrière moved to  La Cartoucherie, a former munitions factory in Bourg-lès-Valence.

Filmography

Short length
 L'Eléphant et la baleine (The Elephant and the Whale, 1986), directed by Jacques-Rémy Girerd
 Le Petit cirque de toutes les couleurs (The Little Circus and Other Tales, 1986), directed by Jacques-Rémy Girerd
 Sculpture, sculptures (1988), directed by Jean-Loup Felicioli
 Amerlock (1988), directed by Jacques-Rémy Girerd
 Nos adieux au music-hall (Farewell Musical, 1989), directed by Laurent Pouvaret
 Le Wall (The Wall, 1992), directed by Jean-Loup Felicioli
 Histoire extraordinaire de Mme Veuve Kecskemet (Extraordinary story of Madame Veuve Kecskemet, 1994), directed by Bela Weisz
 Une Bonne journée (A Pleasant Day, 1994), directed by Matthias Bruhn
 Le Moine et le poisson (The Monk and the Fish, 1994), directed by Michaël Dudok de Wit.
 L'Abri (The Shelter, 1995), directed by Arnaud Pendrié
 Paroles en L'air (Winged Words, 1995), directed by Sylvain Vincendeau
 Le Grande Migration (The Great Migration, 1995), directed by Youri Tcherenkov
 Na kraju zemli (Au bout du monde in French, At the Ends of the Earth, 1999), directed by Konstantin Bronzit
 Histoire Tragique avec fin heureuse (Tragic Story with Happy Ending, 2005) directed by Regina Pessoa
 Les Conquérants (The Conquerors, 2011) directed by Tibor Bánóczki and Sarolta Szabó aka Domestic Infelicity

Medium length (TV Specials, 26')
 L'Enfant au grelot (Charlie's Christmas, 1998) directed by Jacques-Rémy Girerd.
 Patate et le jardin potager (Spud and the vegetable garden, 2000) directed by Damien Louche-Pelissier and Benoit Chieux
 L'Hiver de Léon (Leon in Wintertime, 2008) directed by Pierre-Luc Granjon and Pascal Le Nôtre
 Le Printemps de Mélie (Molly in Springtime, 2009) directed by Pierre-Luc Granjon

TV series
 Ariol: 78 episodes, directed by Emilie Sengelin and Amandine Fredon. Broadcasting on TF1 (French channel) in 2009/2010.
 Hilltop Hospital: 5 seasons of 10 episodes, directed by Pascal Le Nôtre
 My Little Planet: 2 seasons of 13 épisodes, directed by Jacques-Rémy Girerd
 Tidbits for Toddlers: 40 episodes, directed by Jacques-Rémy Girerd
 The Joy of Life: 20 episodes, directed by Jacques-Rémy Girerd
 My Donkey: 30 traditional French folksongs, directed by Pascal Le Nôtre
 Michel

Full-length Feature
 Raining Cats and Frogs (La Prophétie des grenouilles, 2003) directed by Jacques-Rémy Girerd.
 Mia and the Migoo (Mia et le Migou, 2008) directed by Jacques-Rémy Girerd. The film won in 2009 the European Film Award for Best European animated feature film (European Film Academy)
 A Cat in Paris (Une vie de chat, 2010) directed by Alain Gagnol and Jean-Loup Felicioli. Release date in French theaters : 2010 December, 15th. International distribution : Films Distribution, Paris . The film received in 2012 a nomination for Academy Award for Best Animated Feature Film.
 Aunt Hilda! (Tante Hilda!, 2014) directed by Jacques-Rémy Girerd.
 Phantom Boy (2015) directed by Alain Gagnol and Jean-Loup Felicioli. Release date in French theaters : 2015 October, 14th.

References

External links
 
 Folimage on Facebook (official page)
 Folimage on Youtube
 Folimage on Dailymotion
 Company entry in the Big Cartoon DataBase

French animation studios
Film production companies of France
Mass media companies established in 1981
1981 establishments in France
French brands